Cordulecerus elegans is a species of owlflies, neuropteran insects in the family Ascalaphidae. It is found in South America.

References

External links 

 Cordulecerus elegans at insectoid.info

Ascalaphidae
Insects described in 1909